Mamou (Pular: 𞤃𞤢𞥄𞤥𞤵𞤲) is a city and sub-prefecture in a valley of the Fouta Djallon area of Guinea.The population is 376,269 (2018 est), and 98% of the residents are of the Fulani ethnic group.

History 

It grew around the railway line from Conakry to Kankan and soon became the local administrative headquarters.  Its main industry used to be until the 1990s decade meat processing, while it also acts as an important transport hub.  All vehicles going to the Fouta Jallon, the forest region or Haute Guinée have to travel through Mamou.

Climate
Mamou has a tropical savanna climate (Köppen climate classification Aw).

See also 

 Railway stations in Guinea

Namesake 

There is another town in Guinea with the same name.

Schools 
 Lycee Amilcar Cabra
 Institut Supérieur de Technologie Mamou

 École privée Lamarana Diallo

Hospitals 
 Hôpital Regional De Mamou

Houses of Worship 
 Grande Mosquée de Mamou

References

External links 

Regional capitals in Guinea
Sub-prefectures of the Mamou Region